The Defeat of Sennacherib is an oil-on-panel painting by Peter Paul Rubens, now in the Alte Pinakothek in Munich, produced ca.1612–1614. It shows the defeat of the army of Sennacherib by an angel, as described in 2 Kings:19. It is a pendant to The Conversion of Saint Paul, now in the Courtauld Gallery in London.

References

External links
https://web.archive.org/web/20150104182214/http://www.pinakothek.de/node/46983

1614 paintings
Paintings by Peter Paul Rubens
Paintings depicting Hebrew Bible themes
Collection of the Alte Pinakothek
Angels in art
Horses in art
Sennacherib